Gérard Pierre Cornuéjols (born November 16, 1950) is the IBM University Professor of Operations Research in the Carnegie Mellon University Tepper School of Business. His research interests include facility location, integer programming, balanced matrices, and perfect graphs.

Education and career
Cornuéjols graduated from École nationale des ponts et chaussées and earned his Ph.D. in 1978 from Cornell University under the supervision of George Nemhauser, with a dissertation concerning facility location.

He was editor-in-chief of Mathematics of Operations Research from 1999 to 2003.
He was an invited speaker at the International Congress of Mathematicians in 2002.

Books
Cornuéjols is the author of:
Combinatorial Optimization: Packing and Covering (Society for Industrial and Applied Mathematics, 2001).
Optimization Methods in Finance (With Reha Tütüncü, Cambridge University Press, 2007).
Integer Programming (With Michele Conforti and Giacomo Zambelli, Graduate Texts in Mathematics 271, Springer-Verlag, 2014).

Awards and honors
In 1977, Cornuéjols was one of the winners of the Frederick W. Lanchester Prize of the Institute for Operations Research and the Management Sciences (INFORMS).

In 2000, he won the Fulkerson Prize with Michele Conforti and Mendu Rammohan Rao for their work on algorithms for recognizing balanced matrices.

In 2009, the Mathematical Optimization Society gave him their George B. Dantzig Prize.

In 2011, he won the John von Neumann Theory Prize of INFORMS "for his fundamental and broad contributions to discrete optimization including his deep research on balanced and ideal matrices, perfect graphs and cutting planes for mixed-integer optimization".

In 2016, he was elected a member of the National Academy of Engineering for contributions to the theory, practice, and application of integer programming..

References

1950 births
Living people
20th-century American mathematicians
21st-century American mathematicians
Cornell University alumni
Carnegie Mellon University faculty
American operations researchers
Members of the United States National Academy of Engineering
John von Neumann Theory Prize winners